Joseph-Marie Sardou, S.C.J. (25 October 1922 – 19 September 2009) was a French Roman Catholic archbishop.

Ordained to the priesthood on 12 May 1949, Sardou was appointed Archbishop of the Roman Catholic Archdiocese of Monaco, by Pope John Paul II on 31 May 1985 and was ordained a bishop on 30 September 1985. Archbishop Sardou retired on 16 May 2000, and died on 19 September 2009. His successor was Bernard Barsi.

Notes

1922 births
2009 deaths
Archbishops of Monaco
French Roman Catholic archbishops